Razboyna or Razbojna is a village in Ruen Municipality, in Burgas Province, in southeastern Bulgaria. The total area of the village is roughly 14km², with a population of 858 (per the 2016 estimate) indicating a population density of 61.38/km²

References

Villages in Burgas Province